Socothrips is a genus of thrips in the family Phlaeothripidae.

Species
 Socothrips verrucosus

References

Phlaeothripidae
Thrips
Thrips genera